Antonio Santos Peralba (born 1 November 1885 – ??) was a Spanish football administrator who was the 10th President of Real Madrid from 27 November 1940 until 11 September 1943.

References

1885 births
Year of death unknown
People from Pontevedra
Spanish sports executives and administrators
Real Madrid CF presidents